Melissa Lozada-Oliva (born September 7, 1992) is an American poet and educator based in New York. Her poem, "Like Totally Whatever" won the 2015 National Poetry Slam Championship, and went viral.

Life and career  
Lozada-Oliva was born and raised in Newton, Massachusetts by immigrant parents; her mother is Guatemalan and her father is Colombian. She attended college at Simmons University, where she began to perform slam poetry, and graduated in 2014. 

After graduation, she published the chapbooks Plastic Pajaros in 2015 and Rude Girl is Lonely Girl! in 2016. Her performance of a poem called "Like Totally Whatever" won the 2015 National Poetry Slam Championship and received mainstream media coverage.

Lozada-Oliva enrolled in New York University's MFA program for Creative Writing in fall 2017. As of spring 2019, she is also teaching a class there. She published Peluda  through Button Poetry shortly after enrollment. In it, Lozada-Oliva "explores, interrogates and redefines the intersections of Latina identity, feminism, hair removal & what it means to belong."

In December 2018, Lozada-Oliva started a podcast called Say More along with her best friend and fellow poet Olivia Gatwood. The pair interview each other on topics and answer questions from listeners.

Her verse novel Dreaming of You was released in 2021.

Works

Novels
 Dreaming of You (2021)

Poetry
Chapbooks
 Plastic Pajaros (2015)
 Rude Girl is Lonely Girl! (Pizza Pi Press, 2016)
 Peluda (Button Poetry, 2017)

Awards 
 2015 National Poetry Slam Championship
 Brenda Moosey Video Slam winner

References

External links
 Official website

Living people
1992 births
21st-century American poets
American women poets
21st-century American women writers
American spoken word poets
Hispanic and Latino American women in the arts
People from Newton, Massachusetts
Simmons University alumni
American people of Colombian descent
American people of Guatemalan descent
Hispanic and Latino American poets